Aethiophysa dimotalis is a moth in the family Crambidae. It is found in Honduras.

References

Moths described in 1865
Glaphyriinae
Moths of Central America